Óscar Duarte may refer to:

 Óscar Duarte (footballer, born 1950), former Portuguese footballer
 Óscar Duarte (footballer, born 1989), Costa Rican  footballer